Juan José Trillo (born April 17, 1909, date of death unknown) was an Argentine boxer who competed in the 1928 Summer Olympics and in the 1932 Summer Olympics. He was born in Buenos Aires. In 1928 he was eliminated in the second round of the flyweight class after losing his fight to Cuthbert Taylor of Great Britain. Four years later he was eliminated in the first round of the flyweight class after losing his fight to Werner Spannagel of Germany.

1928 Olympic results
Below is the record of Juan José Trillo, an Argentinian flyweight boxer who competed at the 1928 Amsterdam Olympics:

 Round of 32: bye
 Round of 16: lost to Cuthbert Taylor (Great Britain) by decision

1932 Olympic results
Below is the record of Juan José Trillo, an Argentinian flyweight boxer who competed at the 1932 Los Angeles Olympics:

 Round of 16: lost to Werner Spannagel (Germany) by decision

External links
Juan José Trillo's profile at Sports Reference.com

1909 births
Year of death missing
Boxers from Buenos Aires
Flyweight boxers
Olympic boxers of Argentina
Boxers at the 1928 Summer Olympics
Boxers at the 1932 Summer Olympics
Argentine male boxers